Sir Richard Waldegrave ( 1338 – 2 May 1410) was a Member of Parliament for Suffolk and Speaker of the House of Commons during the reign of King Richard II.

Life
His father, Sir Richard Waldegrave, of Brant Broughton, Lincolnshire, had been returned to Parliament in 1335 as knight of the shire for Lincolnshire.

Richard (the son) resided at Smallbridge Hall in Suffolk, and was returned to Parliament twelve times as a knight of the shire for Suffolk between 1376 and 1390. He was first elected in 1376, and then again in Oct 1377, 1378 and 1381, when he was elected speaker of the House of Commons. He however prayed the king to discharge him from the office, the first instance, according to James Alexander Manning , of a speaker seeking to be excused. 

The king, however, insisted on him fulfilling his duties. During his speakership parliament was chiefly occupied with the revocation of the charters granted to the villeins by Richard during Wat Tyler's rebellion. It was dissolved in February 1382.

Waldegrave later represented Suffolk in the two parliaments of 1382, in those of 1383, in that of 1386, in those of 1388, and in that of January 1389–90.
He held a number of public appointments but was finally excused from office in 1404.

Death
He died at Smallbridge on 2 May 1410, and was buried on the north side of the parish church of St. Mary at Bures in Suffolk. He had married Joan, widow of Sir Robert Bures, of Bures St. Mary, and heiress of Silvester, by whom he had a son, Sir Richard Waldegrave.

References
History of Parliament WALDEGRAVE, Sir Richard (c.1338–1410) of Walgrave, Northants and Smallbridge in Bures St Mary, Suffolk

Attribution

1330s births
1410 deaths
Year of birth uncertain
People from Babergh District
Richard Waldegrave
Speakers of the House of Commons of England
English MPs 1376
English MPs October 1377
English MPs 1378
English MPs 1381
English MPs May 1382
English MPs October 1382
English MPs February 1383
English MPs October 1383
English MPs 1386
English MPs February 1388
English MPs September 1388
English MPs January 1390